is a 1998 V-Cinema erotic thriller film starring Chieko Shiratori. It is the sixth installment of the Zero Woman film series.

Plot
Rei, a woman without a past or identity, is an undercover agent to the Zero Department, a deadly underground division of the Japanese police force. Someone has been slaughtering innocent people for the medical Black market. Rei is assigned to kill the mysterious criminal, and her only lead is a mistress of a large criminal boss, who is seducing Rei.

Cast
 Chieko Shiratori as Rei
 Ichiho Matsuda as Nana
 Terunori  Miyazaki as Natsume
 Ken Miyawaki as Yamaguchi
 Daisuke Ryu as Mutoh
 Masayoshi Nogami as Kaneda
 Shira Shitamoto as Kirishima
 Keizo Nagashima as Tanabe
 Tadashi Okuno as Satake
 Satoshi Furukawa
 Mitsuyoshi Nakamura
 Masami Tachi

English dub cast
 Suzy Prue as Rei
 Pink Champale as Nana
 J.K. Ellemeno as Natsume
 Rodd Stone as Yamaguchi
 Ted as Mutoh
 Tristan Goddard as Kaneda
 Fergus Lawless as Kirishima
 Scott Cargle as Tanabe
 Chunky Mon as Satake
 Jonathan Boggs
 Jeff Gimble
 Skooter Larue

Release
The film was released direct-to-video on May 1, 1998, in Japan. The DVD version was released on November 24, 2000. Central Park Media licensed the film under their Asia Pulp Cinema label. The film was released on subtitled VHS on February 13, 2001. CPM later released the film on DVD with an English dub on March 9, 2004. The English dub was produced by Mercury Productions in New York City.

See also
 Girls with guns
 Zero Woman, for other films in the franchise

References

External links
 

1990s erotic thriller films
1998 direct-to-video films
1998 films
Central Park Media
Direct-to-video erotic thriller films
Girls with guns films
Japanese direct-to-video films
Japanese erotic thriller films
1990s Japanese films
1990s Japanese-language films